Urania bat Abraham of Worms (died 11 February 1275), also known as Orania and Orgiah, was a Jewish precentress in medieval Ashkenaz (Rhineland and the Palatinate). Urania's role as a precentress, one of a handful of women known to be serving in this capacity in this region in the 13-14th centuries, is attested on her grave stone.

Biography
Little is known about Urania save that she died a young woman, the daughter of a Rabbi Avraham. The exact pronunciation of her name is uncertain. Rochelle Furstenberg spells the name as Urania—likely relating this woman's name to "Heavens"—while David Sperber spells her name Orania.

Urania died on Adar 6 (February 11), 1275, likely in the morning. Her tombstone, in the city of Worms, reads as in English follows:

References

1275 deaths
Year of birth unknown
Medieval Jewish women
Women hazzans
People from Worms, Germany
13th-century German Jews